Brinley Roderick Rees (27 December 1919 – 21 October 2004) was a Welsh academic. He wrote extensively on Classics, particularly the study of the Greek language. His early work was devoted to Greek papyri; a later publication was devoted to the life and letters of Pelagius.

Life and career
Rees was born on 27 December 1919. His father was a winder in the Mynydd (Mountain) colliery in Gorseinon, and Brinley was one of four children including Alwyn D. Rees. Rees was educated at Christ College, Brecon, Wales, and Merton College, Oxford, and after wartime service in the Royal Welch Fusiliers took his first academic position at Cardiff High School for Boys, where he was Assistant Master between 1947 and 1948.

Rees then started his long career in higher education. In 1948, he became lecturer in Classics at the University College of Wales, Aberystwyth, then senior lecturer in Greek at the University of Manchester from 1956. From there, he went to the University of Wales College, Cardiff, where he was Professor of Greek from 1958 to 1970. During that time, he was also successively Dean of Arts (1963–1965) and Dean of Students (1967–1968). In 1970 he moved to the University of Birmingham, but stayed there only five years, for in 1975, he was appointed as principal of St David's University College, Lampeter, the very first principal in the college's long history who was not in holy orders.  He was a Welsh Supernumerary Fellow of Jesus College, Oxford, in 1975–1976 by virtue of his position as Principal of St David's.

Rees' time at Lampeter came to an end when he retired in 1980, but his involvement in higher education had not come to an end, for he was vice-president of the University of Wales College, Cardiff, between 1986 and 1988.

In 1981, the University of Wales awarded him an honorary LLD in recognition of his service to the colleges at Lampeter, Cardiff and Aberystwyth.

In 1951 Rees married Zena Muriel Stella Mayall; they had two sons. Rees died on 21 October 2004.

Publications
Ieuan Gwynedd: Detholiad o'i Ryddiaith, 1957
The Merton Papyri, Vol. II (with H. I. Bell and J. W. B. Barns), 1959
The Use of Greek, 1961
Papyri from Hermopolis and other Byzantine Documents, 1964
Lampas: a new approach to Greek (with M. E. Jervis), 1970
Classics: an outline for intending students, 1970
Aristotle’s Theory and Milton’s Practice, 1972
Strength in What Remains, 1980

The Letters of Pelagius and his Followers, 1991
Pelagius: life and letters, 1998

References

1919 births
2004 deaths
Welsh classical scholars
Alumni of Merton College, Oxford
Academics of Cardiff University
Academics of Aberystwyth University
Academics of the University of Manchester
Academics of the University of Birmingham
Fellows of Jesus College, Oxford
People educated at Christ College, Brecon
People associated with the University of Wales, Lampeter
Academics of the University of Wales, Lampeter
Classical scholars of the University of Birmingham
Presidents of the Classical Association